Michael Shaun Offei (born 4 October 1966) is an English actor. He is best known for starring in the CBeebies children's TV show The Story Makers, a role he took up in 2002.

Filmography

Film

Television

References

External links
 

1966 births
Living people
Male actors from London
English male television actors
English male film actors
English people of Ghanaian descent